The Helicopini are a tribe of metalmark butterflies (family Riodinidae).

Genera

Anteros Hübner, [1819]
Helicopis Fabricius, 1807
Ourocnemis Baker, 1887
Sarota Westwood, [1851]

As numerous Riodinidae genera have not yet been unequivocally assigned to a tribe, the genus list is preliminary. In fact, it is likely that the bulk of the Riodinidae incertae sedis belongs into this group.

Footnotes

References
  (2007): Markku Savela's Lepidoptera and some other life forms: Riodinidae. Version of 2007-AUG-07. Retrieved 2007-SEP-09.

Further reading
Révision du genre Helicopis (Erycinidae) E. Le Moult Paris : Novitates Entomologicae, 1939.

Riodininae
Taxa named by Enzio Reuter
Butterfly tribes